The Star Schools Program is a United States government program created to honor schools.  Established as part of the United States Department of Education in 1988, the purpose of this program is to:

 Encourage improved instruction in mathematics, science, foreign languages, and other subjects.
 Serve underserved populations, including disadvantaged, non-reading, and limited English proficient populations and individuals with disabilities. Star Schools grants are made to eligible telecommunications partnerships, to enable such partnerships to:
 develop, construct, acquire, maintain, and operate telecommunications audio and visual facilities and equipment;
 develop and acquire educational and instructional programming; and
 obtain technical assistance for the use of such facilities and instructional programming.

See also
United States Department of Education
Education for Economic Security Act
No Child Left Behind

References

Star Schools Program

Education in the United States
United States Department of Education
Schools programs